Lines of Wellington is a 2012 Franco-Portuguese epic war film and television series prepared by Chilean director Raúl Ruiz and completed by his widow Valeria Sarmiento. Its title refers to the historical Lines of Torres Vedras.

The film was in competition for the Golden Lion at the 69th Venice International Film Festival. It was also shown at the 2012 San Sebastián International Film Festival, the 2012 Toronto International Film Festival and the 2012 New York Film Festival. The film was selected as the Portuguese entry for the Best Foreign Language Film at the 86th Academy Awards, but it was not nominated.

Plot
In the autumn of 1810, the French forces of Marshal Masséna are invading Portugal and are temporarily halted by the Anglo-Portuguese army under Viscount Wellington at the Battle of Bussaco. As a bitter winter approaches, Wellington withdraws his troops towards the fortifications he has prepared in secret at the Lines of Torres Vedras. Using a scorched earth defence, he forces the inhabitants to evacuate the land in front of the Lines and destroys all supplies which could be useful to the French. The film illustrates these dramatic events by a series of vignettes which show the effects on combatants, both regular soldiers and guerrillas, and on the civilian population.

Cast
John Malkovich as General Wellington
Soraia Chaves as Martírio  
Vincent Pérez as Lévêque
Marisa Paredes as Dona Filipa
Melvil Poupaud as Marshal Massena
Mathieu Amalric as General Marbot
Elsa Zylberstein as Sister Irmã Cordélia
Christian Vadim as Marshal Soult
Ricardo Pereira
Carloto Cotta as Pedro de Alencar
Nuno Lopes as Francisco Xavier
Jemima West as Maureen
Catherine Deneuve as Severina
Isabelle Huppert as Cosima Pia 
Malik Zidi as Octave Ségur 
Chiara Mastroianni as Hussardo  
Michel Piccoli as Leópold Scheitzer   
Victoria Guerra as Clarissa
Maria João Bastos as Maria de Jesus
Marcello Urgeghe as Jonathan Foster
José Afonso Pimentel as Zé Maria

Reception
Jaime N. Christley of Slant Magazine wrote "Dull but never dreary, Lines of Wellington was one of the projects in Raúl Ruiz's pipeline before he passed away last year".

According to Xan Brooks of The Guardian "This epic historical pageant 'conceived by' the late director Raoul Ruiz won't win the top prize in Venice, but it's full of life"

See also
List of submissions to the 86th Academy Awards for Best Foreign Language Film
List of Portuguese submissions for the Academy Award for Best Foreign Language Film

References

External links

2012 war drama films
Portuguese drama films
2010s Portuguese-language films
Films directed by Valeria Sarmiento
Films produced by Paulo Branco
Films set in 1810
Napoleonic Wars films
French war drama films
War epic films
War films based on actual events
Cultural depictions of Arthur Wellesley, 1st Duke of Wellington
Lines of Torres Vedras
2012 drama films
2010s French films